Guyonia is a genus of flowering plants belonging to the family Melastomataceae.

Its native range is Tropical Africa. It is found in the countries of Angola, Cameroon, Central African Republic, Congo, Equatorial Guinea, Gabon, Guinea, Gulf of Guinea Is., Ivory Coast, Liberia, Nigeria, Sierra Leone, Sudan, Tanzania, Uganda, Zambia and Zaire.

The genus name of Guyonia is in honour of Jean Guyon (1794–1870), a French military doctor and chief military surgeon in Algeria.
It was first described and published in Ann. Sci. Nat., Bot., séries 3, Vol.14 on page 149 in 1850.

Known species
According to Kew:
Guyonia antennina 
Guyonia arenaria 
Guyonia ciliata 
Guyonia cinerascens 
Guyonia entii 
Guyonia glandulosa 
Guyonia humilis 
Guyonia jacquesii 
Guyonia pygmaea 
Guyonia rupicola 
Guyonia seretii 
Guyonia sylvestris 
Guyonia tenella

References

Melastomataceae
Melastomataceae genera
Plants described in 1850
Flora of East Tropical Africa
Flora of West Tropical Africa